María Luisa Bergaz Conesa (born 17 September 1947; Xeraco, Valencian Community) is a Spanish politician. From 2003-2004 she served as a Member of the European Parliament, representing Spain for the United Left. From November 2003-April 2004 she served as Vice-Chair of the Temporary committee on improving safety at sea.

Prior to her appointment, she served as a Member of both the Committee on Petitions and the Committee on the Environment, Public Health and Food Safety, and was a substitute for the European Parliament Committee on Employment and Social Affairs and the EP's Committee on Women's Rights and Gender Equality.

References

1947 births
Living people
MEPs for Spain 1999–2004
20th-century women MEPs for Spain
21st-century women MEPs for Spain
United Left (Spain) MEPs
People from Safor